Lars Stalfors multi-platinum music mixer, Producer, and engineer based in Los Angeles, California. 

Stalfors began his career as a touring member and engineer for the progressive rock band The Mars Volta in the 2000s. Since then, he has worked with many popular artists and songs as a mixer and engineer, including "Sit Next to Me" by Foster the People, which earned Platinum certification and charted high on the Billboard Hot 100. He also produced and mixed the song "First" by Cold War Kids, which received a Platinum certification from the RIAA, and mixed the Gold record "Come Over When You're Sober, Pt. 1" by Lil Peep.

In addition to his engineering and mixing work, Stalfors produced  the Grammy Award-winning song "Masseduction" by St. Vincent, which won the Grammy Award for Best Rock Song in 2019. Stalfors has also produced and mixed The Neighbourhood's record "Hard to Imagine The Neighbourhood Ever Changing", which includes the hit song "Softcore". The track has been certified Platinum by the RIAA. With his exceptional skills and extensive experience, Stalfors has become one of the most sought-after music producers and mixers in the industry. He has worked with artists from a range of genres, including indie rock, alternative, pop, and hip hop.

Discography

References

External links
Official website

American keyboardists
Record producers from California
Musicians from California
Living people
Year of birth missing (living people)